Kavak (also: Kavakköy, Laz language: Yak'oviti) is a village in the Arhavi District, Artvin Province, Turkey. Its population is 421 (2021).

References

Villages in Arhavi District
Laz settlements in Turkey